Adams Station may refer to:
Adams Station, California
Adams Station, former name of Adams, Tennessee
Adams station (New York Central Railroad), a disused train station in Adams, Massachusetts
Adams station (Wisconsin), a station on the Chicago & North Western Railway line between Milwaukee and Wyeville in Adams, Wisconsin